Dəyirmandağ (also, Dagirmandag) is a village and municipality in the Gadabay Rayon of Azerbaijan.  It has a population of 3,359.  The municipality consists of the villages of Dəyirmandağ, Qurudərə, Köhnəkənd, Hacıələkbərli, and Sarıköynək.

References 

Populated places in Gadabay District